Kathryn Posin (born March 23, 1943) is an American choreographer  known for her musical and sculptural fusing of ballet and modern dance genres. In addition to choreographing, she has also taught technique and composition at several American universities. Her most recent season with The Kathryn Posin Dance Company  commissioned by 92nd Street Y in February 2016 received  an award from the Lower Manhattan Cultural Council and an Arts Works Grant from the NEA in 2017.

Biography

Born in Butte, Montana. Posin went to the University of Chicago Laboratory High School and received her BA in Dance at Bennington College (1965) and her MA in Interdisciplinary and World Dance at New York University's Gallatin School of Individualized Study (2004). She studied composition with Louis Horst, Anna Sokolow, Merce Cunningham and Hanya Holm. She has made ballets for Netherlands Dance Theater 1 and 2 (1980),  the Alvin Ailey American Dance Theater and Ailey 2 (1981 & 82),  five ballets for the Milwaukee Ballet from 1991-2016,  On a Fulbright Fellowship she staged her Stepping Stones and Scheherazade for the Bulgarian National Ballet. She was the first international choreographer to make a work for Cloud Gate Dance Theater of Taiwan, in 1981. In 2000 she created the Joffrey/New School BFA and was named founding chair.

Awards
The Kathryn Posin Dance Company founded 1973, has received a Guggenheim Fellowship 1979, a Jerome Robbins Award 1969, The Doris Humphrey Fellowship 1979, and a Bennington College Choreographer's Grant 1981 .The company was also awarded 14 NEA Fellowships and Company Grants from 1974 to 1987,  Kathryn was awarded two Jewish Studies Grants from the Gallatin School of New York University  in 2010 & 2011.

In theater Posin has choreographed the hit rock musical, Salvation (1975) and The Cherry Orchard directed by Andrei Șerban at Lincoln Center (2002), The Boys from Syracuse at American Repertory Theater (2002).

Personal life

Posin is currently Professor of World Dance and Choreography at the Gallatin School at NYU. The next scheduled performance of the Kathryn Posin Dance company will be in 2018 at New York Live Arts.

Choreography and staging credits

 Scheherazade revival (third time) 2016 for The Milwaukee Ballet 
 The Kathryn Posin Dance Company 2016 Meredith Monk and Waves at 92Y
 Voices of Bulgaria and America 2014 at the 92Y at 92Y 
 Scheherazade 2014 National Ballet of Bulgaria in Doha, Qatar Opera House
 Fly, Fly My Sadness 2013 for UN and Bulgarian Consulate and board members
 Scheherazade 2012 Fulbright Fellowship, National Ballet of Bulgaria at New Bulgarian University
 Minotaur and its Labyrinth 2012 Filming at the Palace of the Minotaur on Crete 
 Two Dylan Songs 2011 Jewish Studies Grant commission Gallatin School of NYU
 Stepping Stones 2011 National Ballet of Bulgaria, with Sara-Nora Krysteva, Artistic Director 
 New Work for Students 2010 Syracuse University, Summer Dance
 Time 2 Tango 2010 Eglevsky Ballet of Long Island, Marina Eglevsky, Artistic Director 
 You Are Variations 2010 The Yard, Martha's Vineyard, Wendy Tauscher Artistic Director
 You Are Variations 2010 Gallatin School of NYU, Jewish Studies Grant commissioned 
 Time 2 Tango 2009 Boston Conservatory commissioned, Artistic Director: Yasuko Tokunaga
 Time to Tango Excerpts 2009 Rocky Mountain Ballet Theater, Artistic Director: Charlene Campbell
 Bach's Lunch 2008 Ballet ensemble of Fairfax, Virginia, Artistic Director: Benn and Debra Savage
 Bulgarian Wedding 2007 Ballet Grandiva, Artistic Director: Victor Trevino, tour of Japan
 Scheherazade 2006 Sacramento, Ron Cunningham, Artistic Director
 Scheherazade 2006 Nevada Ballet Theater, Bruce Steivel Artistic Director
 Four World Songs 2006 Utah Regional Ballet, Artistic Director: Jackie College
 Scheherazade 2004 The Milwaukee Ballet, The Nevada Ballet, The Sacramento Ballet
 Scheherazade 2004 The Louisville Ballet, Bruce Simpson, Artistic Director
 Stepping Stones 2003 Kansas City Ballet, Artistic Director: William Whitener
 Waves 2002 Repertory Dance Theater of Salt Lake City Utah
 Thou Shalt Dwell with Me 2002 Ballet Builders, New York City
 Scheherazade 2002 Milwaukee Ballet, Director: Michael Pink
 The Seasons 2002 Central Pennsylvania Youth Ballet, Director: Marcia Dale Weary 
 Stepping Stones 2001 Kansas City Ballet, Director: William Whitener
 John Adams Violin Concerto 2000 The Sacramento Ballet, Director: Ron Cunningham
 Stepping Stones 2000 Kansas City Ballet, Director: William Whitener
 Bridge of Song 1999 Milwaukee Ballet, Director: Simon Dow
 Tehillim 1999 Milwaukee Ballet, Director: Simon Dow
 Crossroads and Stepping Stones 1998 The Hartford Ballet, Director: Enid Lynn & Peggy Lyman
 John Adams Violin Concerto 1997 Ballet Builders, New York City
 Bach's Lunch 1996 Milwaukee Ballet, Director: Basil Thompson
 Four World Songs 1996 The Sarasota Ballet, Director: Robert De Warren
 Stepping Stones 1995 Ballet Met, Columbus, Ohio, Director: David Nixon
 Stepping Stones 1995 Milwaukee Ballet, Director: Basil Thompson
 The Rainforest 1994 Alvin Ailey Repertory Ensemble, New York City, Director: Sylvia Waters
 Reconstruction of Waves 1994 University of Massachusetts, Director: Andrea Watkins
 The Rainforest 1994 City College of New York Dance Department, Director: Dawn Horwitz
 Stepping Stones 1993 Milwaukee Ballet, Milwaukee, Director: Dane La Fontsee
 Repercussions 1991 Cloudgate Dance Theater, Taipei, Taiwan, Director: Lin Hwi Min
 Of Rage and Remembrance 1990 Milwaukee Ballet, Director: Dane La Fontsee
 Hunger and Thirst 1990 Alvin Ailey Repertory Ensemble, Director: Sylvia Waters
 Harmony of Leaves 1989 Trinity College, Hartford, Connecticut
 Shock Crossing 1988 University of California, Los Angeles
 Hurts Too Much To Stop 1987 Royce Hall, University of California, Los Angeles
 Waves 1986 Alvin Ailey American Dance Theater, Director: Alvin Ailey
 Later That Day 1981 Alvin Ailey American Dance Theater, NYC commissioned Director: Alvin Ailey
 Brandenburg 1981 Ballet West, Salt Lake City, Utah, Director: Bruce Marks
 Ich Ruf Zu Dir and Waves 1980 Netherlands Dance Theater, The Hague, Director: Jiri Kylian
 Waves 1979 Eliot Feld Ballet, New York City, Director: Eliot Feld
 The Closer She Gets The Better She Looks 1979 Juilliard Dance Ensemble, Director: Martha Hill
 Waves 1975 American Dance Festival, Connecticut College, Director: Charles Reinhart

References
Lower Manjhattan Council Grant

External links
 at Gallatin School of Individualized Study, New York University
Kathryn Posin Dance Company
Kathryn Posin Dance Company on Facebook

American choreographers
American women choreographers
National Endowment for the Arts Fellows
New York University faculty
1943 births
Living people
New York University Gallatin School of Individualized Study alumni
Bennington College alumni
University of Chicago Laboratory Schools alumni
21st-century American women